Oronoco is a premium rum from Brazil, produced by cachaça makers Vicente, and Roberto Bastos Ribeiro.

Production

Oronoco is produced by Vicente, and Roberto Bastos Ribeiro, a distillery in Brazil known for producing cachaça, it is made from mountain-grown sugar cane, with a taste popularly described as possessing hints of vanilla and molasses.

Awards

Gold Medal, 2005 San Francisco World Spirits Competition.

References

Rums
Brazilian brands